Amarindra (15 March 1737 – 25 May 1826) was the Queen Consort of King Phutthayotfa Chulalok (Rama I), the founder of the Chakri dynasty. Her birth name was Nak (นาค). She was a daughter of a wealthy Mon from Bang Chang, in Samut Songkhram Province.

Biography
Nak was born in 1737 to a local patron of Bang Chang named Thong and his wife San. She was then married to Thong Duang the Luang Yokkrabat of Ratchaburi (future Rama I) around 1760 to avoid being taken as a court lady to King Ekathat. She having three sons and seven daughters to Thong Duang. Her sister, Nuan, was married to Bunnag – the progenitor of Bunnag family.

Thong Duang was granted the title Somdet Chao Phraya by King Taksin in 1776. In 1779, the Somdet Chao Phraya went on his campaigns against Vientiane and took a daughter of King Suriyavong of Vientiane as his concubine – Kamwaen. Kam Waen became Somdet Chao Phrayas favorite much to the dismay of Nak. One day, she beat Kam Waen with a wooden stick and Kam Waen ran for the Somdet Chao Phraya. The Somdet Chao Phraya was enraged with the incident and threatened to murder Nak with a sword, only with the help of her son Chim (the future Rama II) was Nak able to flee to the Thonburi Palace to live with her daughter Chimyai (concubine to King Taksin).

After the incident, Nak and the king had never came into reconciliation. Lady Nak stayed in the Thonburi Palace with her daughter and after her death in 1779 took care of her children including Prince Kasatranuchit. The Somdet Chao Phraya became a monarch in 1782 and most of Taksin's sons were executed except for Prince Kasatranuchit who was his own grandson. Lady Nak and her grandsons moved to her former resident and had never received any royal titles. She occasionally went to the Grand Palace to visit her daughters. In 1809, King Rama I died and was succeeded by his son Rama II who raised his mother Nak to the rank of queen – Krom Somdet Phra Amarindramat''' the Queen Mother and moved to the Grand Palace. However, Prince Kasatranuchit was found to be in a rebellion and was executed along with his siblings and sons. She lived to see her grandson crowned as Rama III and outlived all her children. Queen Amarindra died in 1826.

Queen Amarindra was later raised to Somdet Phra Amarindra Boromma Rajini'' by King Vajiravudh.

Queen Amarindra had a total ten children with King Rama I; three sons and seven daughters
A princess (died in Ayutthaya period)
A prince (died in Ayutthaya period)
Princess Chimyai (?–1779) royal concubine to King Taksin
Prince Chim (1767–1824) The Prince Isarasundhorn, The Viceroy of His Majesty King Rama I
Princess Chaem (1770–1808) The Princess Sisunthornthep
A princess (died in Thonburi period)
Prince Chui (1773–1817) The Prince Senanurak The Viceroy of His Majesty King Rama II
A princess (died in Thonburi period)
A princess (died in Thonburi period)
Princess Prapaiwadi (1777–1823) The Princess Thepayawadi

Ancestry

References

External links
 THE RATTANAKOSIN PERIOD
 Queens and main Consorts of the Chakri Dynasty
 Steeped in tradition

1737 births
1826 deaths
People from Samut Songkhram province
Thai people of Mon descent
18th-century Chakri dynasty
19th-century Chakri dynasty
18th-century Thai people
19th-century Thai people
Thai queens consort
Queen mothers